Super Best may refer to:

Super Best (The Blue Hearts album)
Super Best (Shizuka Kudo album)
Super Best, album by Lindberg (band)
Super Best, album by Chage & Aska
Super Best Records: 15th Celebration, compilation album by Japanese R&B singer Misia 
The Great Vacation Vol. 2: Super Best of Glay compilation album by Japanese band Glay 2009
The Great Vacation Vol. 1: Super Best of Glay compilation album by Japanese band Glay 2009